is a passenger railway station in located in the town of Asahi, Mie Prefecture, Japan, operated by Central Japan Railway Company (JR Tōkai).

Lines
Asahi Station is served by the Kansai Main Line, and is 28.5 rail kilometers from the terminus of the line at Nagoya Station.

Station layout
The station consists of two opposed elevated side platforms. The station is unattended.

Platforms

Adjacent stations

Station history
Asahi Station was opened on August 8, 1983, as a station on the Japan National Railways (JNR). The station was absorbed into the JR Central network upon the privatization of the JNR on April 1, 1987.

Station numbering was introduced to the section of the Kansai Main Line operated JR Central in March 2018; Asahi Station was assigned station number CI08.

Passenger statistics
In fiscal 2019, the station was used by an average of 697 passengers daily (boarding passengers only).

Surrounding area
Asahi Town Office
 Toshiba Mie Factory

See also
 List of railway stations in Japan

References

External links

Railway stations in Japan opened in 1983
Railway stations in Mie Prefecture
Asahi, Mie